ICC U19 Cricket World Cup Americas Qualifier (formerly ICC Americas Under-19 Championship) is an international cricket tournament contested by under-19 national teams from the ICC Americas region. The tournament has run bi-annually since 2001, occasionally with more than one division. The championship also serves as a qualification tournament for the Under-19 World Cup, though the number of teams progressing has varied. The most recent tournament was held in Canada and won by Canada. Canada are by far the most successful team overall, winning seven titles, to the two won by the United States and the single title won by Bermuda.

History

Prior to the introduction of the Americas Under-19 Championship in 2001 there was no qualification route for associate and affiliate teams to the U-19 World Cup. As a result, the only Americas team represented in the 1998 competition was the full member, the West Indies. For the 2000 tournament, a combined Americas team was also given the chance to take part, representing the four longstanding associate members from the region: Canada, USA, Bermuda and Argentina.

With the new championship came the possibility for an individual team to qualify for the U-19 World Cup. The winner of each championship would automatically go through to play in the finals the following year.

In 2009, Under-19 World Cup qualification was changed dramatically and a World Cup Qualifier event was introduced in which the top two teams from each of the ICC regions would compete for the final six places in the U-19 World Cup. In addition to this, the Championship was expanded to two divisions due to the increase in the number of regional teams. The first Division Two tournament took place in 2010.

Tournament results

Division One

Division Two

Participating teams (Division One)
Legend
 – Champions
 – Runners-up
 – Third place
R1 – First round
Q – Qualified
X – Qualified, tournament cancelled
 — Hosts

Records
Scorecards for some matches from the 2001 tournament are unavailable.
Highest team scores
441/5 (50 overs) –  vs , 12 July 2019, at Maple Leaf Cricket Club, King City.
423 all out (49.4 overs) –  vs , 15 August 2007, at Maple Leaf Cricket Club, King City.
382 all out (50 overs) –  vs , 8 August 2001, at Southampton Oval, Hamilton.
364/5 (50 overs) –  vs , 18 July 2003, at Maple Leaf Cricket Club, King City.
347/8 (50 overs) –  vs , 14 July 2003, at Maple Leaf Cricket Club, King City.

Lowest team scores
 22 all out (13.5 overs) –  vs , 12 February 2011, at Brian Piccolo Park, Fort Lauderdale.
 25 all out (15.2 overs) –  vs , 14 July 2003, at Maple Leaf Cricket Club, King City.
 29 all out (15.3 overs) –  vs , 8 July 2019, at Maple Leaf Cricket Club, King City.
 33 all out (21 overs) –  vs , 9 July 2019, at Maple Leaf Cricket Club, King City.
 34 all out (17.4 overs) –  vs , 7 February 2011, at Central Broward Regional Park, Lauderhill.

Highest individual scores
 204 (179 balls) –  Dion Stovell, vs , 18 July 2003, at Maple Leaf Cricket Club, King City.
 155 (107 balls) –  Ruvindu Gunasekera, vs , 15 August 2007, at Maple Leaf Cricket Club, King City.
 151 (104 balls) –  Ashtan Deosammy, vs , 12 July 2019, at Maple Leaf Cricket Club, King City.
 121 (93 balls) –  Harsh Thaker, vs , 10 July 2015, at Somerset Cricket Club Ground, Somerset Village.
 119 (144 balls) –  Terryn Fray, vs , 15 August 2007, at Maple Leaf Cricket Club, King City.

Best bowling figures
7/3 (5 overs) –  Pratik Patel, vs , 15 August 2007, at Maple Leaf Cricket Club, King City.
7/10 (8 overs) –  Raj Vyas, vs , 8 July 2019, at Maple Leaf Cricket Club, King City.
7/12 (7 overs) –  Troy Taylor, vs , 15 July 2003, at Maple Leaf Cricket Club, King City.
7/20 (6.2 overs) –  Jon Roberts, vs , 8 August 2001, at St David's Cricket Club, Hamilton.
6/3 (3.1 overs) –  Akash Shah, vs , 7 February 2011, at Brian Piccolo Park, Fort Lauderdale.

See also

 ICC Americas Championship

Notes

References

Under-19 regional cricket tournaments
Cricket in the Americas